This is a list of amusement parks in North Korea.

 Kaeson Youth Park
 Mangyongdae Funfair
 Munsu Water Park
 Pyongyang Folklore Park
 Rungna People's Pleasure Ground
 Taesongsan Funfair
 There is an amusement park in Sinuiju

See also 
 List of amusement parks in Asia

External links 
 Democratic People's Republic of Korea - Parks/Pleasure Grounds

 
North Korea
Amusement parks
Amusement parks